, also spelled Nukada, was a Japanese poet of the Asuka period.

A legend claims that she later became consort to Emperor Tenji, Emperor Tenmu's elder brother, but there is no evidence to support this claim.

Poetry
Nukata was one of the great female poets of her time; thirteen of her poems appear in the Man'yōshū: 7–9, 16–18, 20, 112, 113, 151, 155, 488, and 1606 (poem 1606 is a repeat of 488). Two of the poems are reprinted in the later poetry collections Shinchokusen Wakashū and Shinshūi Wakashū.

Poem 8 

Poem 9 
The ninth poem of the Man'yōshū is known as one of the most difficult poems within the Man'yōshū to interpret. Nukata composed this poem in 658 when Empress Saimei went to a hot spring in Kii Province:

A common interpretation for the later part of the poem is by Keichū: , which translates to "...my beloved who stands at the foot of the sacred oak".

The first two lines  has already defeated modern scholarship to date. Some theories include:
 , "I see clearly the country atop mount Kagu, o..." (Kaneko)
 , "I went and crossed the mountains of Kii province to..." (Kada no Azumamaro, Tachibana Chikage, Mizue Aso)
 , "The hillside birds have covered the morning snow, o..." (Teiichi Kumekawa)
 , "The inlet's once quietened waves have become noisy, o..." (Hisataka Omodaka, Thomas McAuley)
 , "It's the once-declined trick of standing on one's toes, o..." (Mineko Kawaguchi)
 , "The once quieted thunder has finally roared loudly, o..." (Toshihiko Tsuchihashi)
 , "Our calmed down meetings have widened, o..." (Yamatai association)
 , "I went and saw the twisted field-reeds, o..." (Bunmei Tsuchiya)
 , "It is by seeing mount Matsuchi that I walked with..." (Michiyasu Inoue)
 , "I gazed upon and went to the mountains of Mimuro, o..." (Mokichi Saitō)
 , "I gazed upon and went to the mountains of Mimoro, o..." (Masazumi Kamochi)
 , "I gazed upon and went to the mountains of fair Yoshino, o..." (Tokujirō Oyama)
 , "The evening moon's light covers the clouds, o..." (Keitsū)
 , "The evening moon's light stands in step, o..." (Sueo Itami)
 , "As I looked up the evening moon, I asked..." (Sengaku, Keichū, and Masakoto Kimura)
 , "As celebration dies down, I took mulberry rope to..." (Kaoru Tani)

According to Alexander Vovin, the first two lines should be read in Old Korean, whereby their meaning is similar to the one proposed by Sengaku:

Poem 20 
Nukata composed this poem when Emperor Tenji was out hunting in Gamōno (or the field of Une, now part of Ōmihachiman and Yōkaichi, Shiga):

Notes

References 

 
 
 
 
 
 
 

630 births
690 deaths
7th-century Japanese women writers
7th-century writers
Women of medieval Japan
Japanese princesses
7th-century Japanese poets
Japanese women poets
Man'yō poets
7th-century Japanese women
7th-century Japanese people
Emperor Tenji
Emperor Tenmu